The Holywell Hill transmission site is located on a 260 metre hill near Killea in County Donegal, Ireland, and is owned and operated by 2RN (formerly RTÉ NL). 

The site which is close to the border with Northern Ireland has a 60 metre self-supporting tower and was opened in 1981 to provide UHF television coverage to parts of County Donegal as well as Derry City and County. It originally carried the two Irish analogue channels, RTÉ One (Ch 23), and RTÉ Two (Ch 26), in later years, both TV3 (Ch 29), and TG4 (Ch 33) were added, all were horizontally polarised and with an effective radiated power (ERP) of 20 kw. Digital terrestrial television (DTT) was first broadcast from the site in 2008 in preparation for the national switchover to digital television on 24 October 2012.

Today the Irish digital television service Saorview, and five national radio stations on FM, are broadcast from the Holywell Hill site to a large area of North West Ireland including Derry city. The transmitter also services a number of relay transmitters in County Donegal to help improve coverage in the difficult terrain.

Current transmissions

Digital television

FM radio

Holywell Hill relay transmitters

Gallery

References

External links 
 www.rtenl.ie
 saorview.ie

Transmitter sites in Ireland